Marvin Winkler (born February 18, 1948) is an American former professional basketball player.

A 6'1" guard from the University of Louisiana at Lafayette, Winkler played one season (1970–71) in the National Basketball Association as a member of the Milwaukee Bucks, who drafted him with the 16th pick of the 3rd round of the 1970 NBA draft.  He averaged 2.7 points per game and won a league championship when Milwaukee defeated the Baltimore Bullets in the 1971 NBA Finals.

Winkler spent the 1971–72 season with the Indiana Pacers of the American Basketball Association.  He averaged 2.0 points per game.

References

External links

1948 births
Living people
American men's basketball players
Basketball players from Indianapolis
Indiana Pacers players
Louisiana Ragin' Cajuns men's basketball players
Milwaukee Bucks draft picks
Milwaukee Bucks players
Point guards